Edison Assembly, also known as Metuchen Assembly, was a Ford Motor Company manufacturing plant in Edison, New Jersey. It was located at 939 U.S. Route 1 and occupied over 100 acres when it was open. The factory began operations in 1948 and closed on February 27, 2004. Several popular Ford products were manufactured there, such as the Ford Mustang, Ford Ranger, and the Ford Pinto. When the plant opened, it manufactured the new Mercury branded and Lincoln vehicles. It was one of three Ford manufacturing facilities in New Jersey and was built two years before the Mahwah Assembly plant was opened in 1950.

The plant produced 6.9 million vehicles in total; switching to compact car assembly in the 1960s, it built the Ford Falcon and Mustang and the related Mercury Comet, and then to subcompact cars in 1972 with the Ford Pinto and Mercury Bobcat and later their Escort and Lynx successors.

Production shifted to Ranger pickups in 1990, and produced 1.7 million Rangers along with the related Mazda B-Series.

It was one of only three locations where Ford manufactured the first generation Mustang; the other sites were Dearborn Assembly and Milpitas Assembly in San Jose, California.

As of 2019, the site is occupied by a Sam's Club, Topgolf and various restaurants.

See also
 List of Ford factories

References

External links
History of Ford production in New Jersey

Ford factories
Former motor vehicle assembly plants
Motor vehicle assembly plants in New Jersey
Edison, New Jersey
1948 establishments in New Jersey
2004 disestablishments in New Jersey